Petrinja is a town in central Croatia near Sisak in the historic region of Banovina. It is administratively located in Sisak-Moslavina County.

On December 29, 2020, the town was hit by a strong earthquake with a magnitude of 6.4 , causing significant damage to the town.

Name
The name of Petrinja has its roots in Greek πέτρα - pétra, meaning "stone" through Latin petrus. It is said that the town existed in Roman era in the area of Zrinska Gora, which is very rich in stone.

History

Middle Ages
West of Petrinja is Petrova gora (Peter's mountain), site of the 1097 Battle of Gvozd Mountain between King Petar Svačić of Croatia and Coloman of Hungary.

The first written record of Petrinja as an inhabited settlement is the one about the benefits awarded to the inhabitants of Petrinja by the Slavonian duke Koloman in 1240. This old medieval Petrinja belongs to the time of warring with the Ottoman Empire.

16th and 17th centuries
The old fortress was abandoned and destroyed in 1543, to prevent it from coming under Ottoman control. In 1592, Petrinja was given a new location with the construction and building of an Ottoman fortress at the confluence of the Petrinjčica and Kupa rivers. The fortress was to serve the Ottomans in their offensives in central Croatia, such as the 1593 battle of Sisak.

On August 10, 1594, the fortress was first liberated by the Croatian army. Therefore, August 10 has become the day of gratitude towards God and St. Lawrence, and this saint has been chosen for the patron saint of the parish and the town of Petrinja. Over time, Petrinja attracted craftsmen and merchants whose arrival marks the beginning of the town's development.

In the year 1773, Austrian empress Maria Theresa decided that Petrinja was to be a craft guild center for the entire territory of the Military Frontier.

18th and 19th centuries

Petrinja was part of Napoleon's Illyria from 1809 till 1813 when the town became a significant trade and traffic center. In the same period, the French army planted the linden trees that stand to this day.

The influence of Croatian national revival in the 19th century was felt in Petrinja. That was the time of the founding of the Town Orchestra (1808), Music Department (1841), Library and reading-room (1842), Teachers' Training School (1862), Croatian Choir "Slavulj" (1864), Town fire-brigade (1880), First printing-house (1881).

In the late 19th and early 20th century, Petrinja was a district capital in the Zagreb County of the Kingdom of Croatia-Slavonia.

20th and 21st centuries
From 1929 to 1939, Petrinja was part of the Sava Banovina and from 1939 to 1941 of the Banovina of Croatia within the Kingdom of Yugoslavia.

During the Second World War, with the establishment of the so-called Independent State of Croatia (a fascist puppet state), Petrinja and the surrounding area were the scene of persecution of the Serbian, Jewish and Roma minorities, but also of harsh repression of many Croatian anti-fascists, in a context of armed struggle between partisans and local collaborators of the Axis forces.

Recent history has witnessed the war in Croatia during which many people (Croats first, then the Serbs in 1995) were exiled from their hometown of Petrinja in the period from September 1991 to August 1995. The town itself has gone through severe damage. On November 25, 1991, the Serb mayor of Petrinja Radovan Marković sent a message to Željko Ražnatović to have his troops enter the city as part of a "2. motorized battalion" of the 622. Motorized Brigade of the then already Serbian-dominated Yugoslav People's Army. After Operation Storm in 1995, many monuments have been erected in memory of Croatian war heroes and victims of the war.

In reconstructing and rebuilding their town, the inhabitants of Petrinja took great care of the town's urban tradition by keeping the old customs alive, celebrating Catholic holidays, and organizing numerous cultural, social and sports events.

On 29 December 2020, the town was struck by a violent earthquake of magnitude 6.4 , killing seven people, including a seven-year-old girl. Half of the town was destroyed during the quake. At least 20 people were injured. A series of aftershocks continued to jolt the area, with 291 smaller tremors recorded during the subsequent days.

Economy
City economy is in a major decline for the last 20 years. High impact of the war from the 1990s is felt through the abandonment and depopulation of many villages and closure of many farms which used to supply local meat packing plant  and dairy processors from other cities. Gavrilović still remains the biggest company and employer in the city, currently employing about 800 workers.

Other notable industries are saw mills and wood flooring manufacturing. Former Finel furniture factory now mostly lays abandoned while there are current plans to activate part of its capacity for hardwood flooring manufacturing. Former Ciglana brick factory is now converted into a large saw mill called Nil-Ž and employs more than a 100 people.

Small entrepreneurship is still underdeveloped due to lack of a finished small business zone. City owned agency Poslovne Zone Petrinja has been announcing the opening of a small business zone at the suburb of Mošćenica for the last several years, but there are still no visible results.

Small family farming operations called O.P.G. have been registered by many small farmers but just a few are producing in larger quantity and being able to offer fresh or processed meat, fruits, vegetables, flowers and herbs to markets. Lack of local and national co-operative organization management is making small farmers not competitive enough to other EU producers. This stems from an inherent belief that co-op are a negative heritage from the socialist era of pre-1990 period and should not be established again, while at the same time people buy products produced by strong Italian, Austrian, French and German co-operatives.

City used to have a local transportation company called Slavijatrans, which operated local and regional bus lines and cargo transport with an extensive fleet of fuel, bulk and general cargo carrier trucks. Due to mismanagement and numerous cases of corruption on one hand, and lack of law enforcement in the field of passenger transport, many private taxi's took over the passenger traffic from the most profitable lines, while cargo traffic was gradually reduced to just a few trucks from a fleet of a few hundred trucks. Now the company is sold to a large national carried Čazmatrans and only operates local passenger lines.

 Gavrilović d.o.o. meat packing 
 Ciglana brick factory 
 Nil-Ž sawmill 
 Finel furniture and flooring manufacturing 
 TSH animal feed factory 
 Slavijatrans (Čazmatrans) transportation company, public transit 
 Rotomat specialty rotary sanding discs manufacturing 
 Pekarne EDI bakery chain

Traditional crafts and gastronomy

After the liberation from Ottoman rule at the end of the 16th century, Petrinja started attracting craftsmen and merchants who helped developing the town. There is a very lively tradition of the potting and ceramic crafts, which represent the main souvenir production of the items characteristic for this area, all made of high quality clay. The main souvenir is "stucka", an ornamented multi-use jar made of clay that has become a symbol of the town of Petrinja.

The foundations of the Prva hrvatska tvornica salame, sušena mesa i masti (first Croatian salami, cured meat and lard factory) were set in the year 1792, now developed into the "Gavrilović" factory, the principal factor of the area's economic development, well known for the quality of its gastronomical products.

Landmarks

The first Catholic parish Church of St. Lawrence was first built in 1603, but due to the time and type of building, a new one was built in 1781, in late baroque—classicist style.

A statue of Croatian politician Stjepan Radić was made in Petrinja in 1929 by Mila Wood after his assassination the previous year. In 1936, the statue was placed in the city's central square, which was named after him. In 1963 the communist regime moved the statue to a city park. In 1991, the statue was damaged and thrown into an orchard in a nearby village. It was not found until 1998, when it was restored. In 1999, it was restored to Petrinja's central square, and was unveiled by Croatian minister of culture Božo Biškupić.

Demographics

As of 2011, Petrinja had a population of 24,671, of which 15,683 were living in the urban settlement.

The municipal area includes the following settlements (listed here with their respective 2011 population census numbers):

 Begovići, population 58
 Bijelnik, population 47
 Blinja, population 78
 Brest Pokupski, population 279
 Cepeliš, population 59
 Čuntić, population 27
 Deanovići, population 28
 Dodoši, population 76
 Donja Bačuga, population 142
 Donja Budičina, population 236
 Donja Mlinoga, population 96
 Donja Pastuša, population 11
 Donje Mokrice, population 57
 Dragotinci, population 63
 Dumače, population 272
 Glinska Poljana, population 121
 Gora, population 264
 Gornja Bačuga, population 79
 Gornja Mlinoga, population 33
 Gornja Pastuša, population 31
 Gornje Mokrice, population 105
 Graberje, population 155
 Grabovac Banski, population 200
 Hrastovica, population 464
 Hrvatski Čuntić, population 86
 Jabukovac, population 141
 Jošavica, population 84
 Klinac, population 27
 Kraljevčani, population 63
 Križ Hrastovički, population 141
 Luščani, population 163
 Mačkovo Selo, population 36
 Mala Gorica, population 510
 Međurače, population 36
 Miočinovići, population 43
 Mošćenica, population 2,470
 Moštanica, population 93
 Nebojan, population 191
 Nova Drenčina, population 402
 Novi Farkašić, population 81
 Novo Selište, population 321
 Pecki, population 84
 Petkovac, population 15
 Petrinja, population 15,683
 Prnjavor Čuntićki, population 79
 Sibić, population 67
 Slana, population 92
 Srednje Mokrice, population 33
 Strašnik, population 202
 Stražbenica, population 9
 Taborište, population 227
 Tremušnjak, population 47
 Veliki Šušnjar, population 117
 Vratečko, population 60
 Župić, population 85

Notable people
Chronological list.
 Franjo Jelačić (1746–1810), officer from the House of Jelačić
 Stevan Šupljikac (1786–1848), military commander, duke of Serbian Vojvodina
 Janko Grahor (1827–1906), architect
 Emil Vojnović (1851–1927), Austro-Hungarian Army general, Director of the War Archives in Vienna
 Oton Kučera (1856–1931), astronomer
 Krsto Hegedušić (1901–1975), artist
 Branko Horvat (1928–2003), economist and politician
 Milan Nenadić (1943–), Greco-Roman wrestler
 Drago Roksandić (1948-), historian
 Marijan Vlak (1955–), former football goalkeeper
 Vlado Lisjak (1962–), Greco-Roman wrestler
 Aleksandar Jovančević (1970–), Greco-Roman wrestler

References

External links 

 
 Petrinja.net (in Croatian) 
 Petrinja Online (in Croatian)
 Petrinja Tourist Office

Cities and towns in Croatia
Zagreb County (former)
1240 establishments in Europe
13th-century establishments in Croatia
Populated places in Sisak-Moslavina County